This is a list of Dutch television related events from 2014.

Events
21 February - 13-year-old Ayoub Maach wins the third series of The Voice Kids, becoming the first boy to be crowned as winner.
25 October - 81-year-old opera singer Léon Lissitza wins the seventh series of Holland's Got Talent.
19 December - Three-piece girl group O'G3NE win the fifth series of The Voice of Holland, becoming the first group to emerge as winners.

Debuts

Television shows

1950s
NOS Journaal (1956–present)

1970s
Sesamstraat (1976–present)

1980s
Jeugdjournaal (1981–present)
Het Klokhuis (1988–present)

1990s
Goede tijden, slechte tijden (1990–present)

2000s
X Factor (2006–present)
Holland's Got Talent (2008–present)

2010s
The Voice of Holland (2010–present)

Ending this year

Births

Deaths

See also
2014 in the Netherlands